Anjuna is a village located on the coast of North Goa, India. It is a Census Town, one of the twelve Brahmin comunidades of Bardez. It is mostly a tourist destination.

Its church, St. Michael's Church, Anjuna, founded in 1595, is dedicated to S. Miguel, and celebrates the feasts of S. Miguel (29 September) and Nossa Senhora Advogada (second week of January). There are three large chapels in the parish: the one to S. Antonio (Praias), to Nossa Senhora de Saude (Mazalvaddo), and to Nossa Senhora de Piedade (Grande Chinvar). The chapel at Vagator became the church of the new parish of Vagator, dedicated to S. Antonio, in the twentieth century.

History 

Like all of Goa, Anjuna was long held by the Portuguese.  In 1950, it had a population of 5,688  and, in 2011, it had 9,636.

Historian Teresa Albuquerque reports that the village's name is derived from the Arabic word 'Hanjuman' (meaning Merchant Guild). Others say it comes from an Arabic word for "change" - as people used to arrive at Anjuna from the sea looking to change money.

It became a destination on the hippie trail during the late 1960s.

Activities 

Anjuna is famous for trance parties held on its beach during the tourist season (October - April).

Anjuna also hosts the famous flea market (every Wednesday and Saturday), in which products from all over India, as well as from foreigners, are sold, ranging from fruits to jewelry, to clothes, to hashish and electronic devices. On Wednesdays, there is a day market which starts in the morning and ends at 7:30 pm and on Saturdays, there is a night market.

Anjuna Beach 

Anjuna Beach  is a beach in Goa, which is located 18 kilometers from Panaji and 8 kilometers to the west of Mapusa, North Goa. It is situated in Anjuna village of Bardez taluka in North Goa. The beach is part of a 30 kilometer stretch of extended beach coastline along the west coast of Goa by the Arabian Sea.

Attractions close to Anjuna Beach include the Anjuna flea market and Chapora Fort.

Gallery

In popular culture
Above & Beyond's record labels, Anjunabeats and Anjunadeep, as well as their radio show, 'Anjunabeats Worldwide,' all make reference to Anjuna. In 2009, they also released a track called 'Anjunabeach.' Anjuna beach is also famous for the hippie lifestyle.

References

External links

 Satellite map of Anjuna

Villages in North Goa district
Beaches of Goa
Beaches of North Goa district